
Gmina Zamość is a rural gmina (administrative district) in Zamość County, Lublin Voivodeship, in eastern Poland. Its seat is the town of Zamość, although the town is not part of the territory of the gmina.

Villages
Gmina Zamość contains the villages and settlements of Białobrzegi, Białowola, Borowina Sitaniecka, Bortatycze, Bortatycze-Kolonia, Chyża, Hubale, Jatutów, Kalinowice, Łapiguz, Lipsko, Lipsko-Kosobudy, Lipsko-Polesie, Majdanek, Mokre, Płoskie, Pniówek, Siedliska, Sitaniec, Sitaniec-Kolonia, Sitaniec-Wolica, Skaraszów, Skokówka, Szopinek, Topornica, Wieprzec, Wierzchowiny, Wólka Panieńska, Wólka Wieprzecka, Wychody, Wysokie, Zagóra, Zalesie, Zarzecze, Zawada, Żdanów, Żdanówek and Zwódne.

Neighbouring gminas
Gmina Zamość is bordered by the city of Zamość and by the gminas of Adamów, Łabunie, Nielisz, Sitno, Skierbieszów, Stary Zamość, Szczebrzeszyn and Zwierzyniec.

References

Polish official population figures 2006

Zamosc
Zamość County